CELSS may refer to:
 Cellulose 1,4-beta-cellobiosidase (reducing end), an enzyme
 Controlled Ecological Life Support System